is a former Japanese football player.

Club career
Nishi was born in Fukuoka Prefecture on May 29, 1977. After graduating from high school, he joined his local club Avispa Fukuoka in 1996. Although he got an opportunity to play as center back in 1997, he lost his opportunity to play in 1998. He left the club end of 1998 season and enrolled in Chukyo University in 1999. After graduating from university, he joined Ventforet Kofu in 2003. However he could hardly play in the match and retired end of 2003 season.

National team career
In June 1997, Nishi was selected Japan U-20 national team for 1997 World Youth Championship. At this tournament, he played 1 match against Spain in first game.

Club statistics

References

External links

j-league.or.jp

1977 births
Living people
Chukyo University alumni
Association football people from Fukuoka Prefecture
Japanese footballers
Japan youth international footballers
J1 League players
J2 League players
Avispa Fukuoka players
Ventforet Kofu players
Association football defenders